Jo Jo Makoons is a middle-grade chapter book series, written by Dawn Quigley, illustrated by Tara Audibert, and published  May 11, 2021 by Heartdrum. The series centers Jo Jo Makoons Azure, an Ojibwe girl, and consists of two books: The Use-To-Be Best Friend (2021) and Fancy Pants (2022).

Reception 
Jo Jo Makoons: The Use-To-Be Best Friend received starred reviews from The Horn Book, Shelf Awareness, Publishers Weekly, School Library Journal, and Kirkus, as well as positive reviews from Quill & Quire, CBC Books, Book Page,  and Booklist.

The book was also selected by the Junior Library Guild.

External links 

 In Their Own Words: What Native Author Dawn Quigley Wants You to Know

References 

2021 children's books
American children's book series